The Journey Away is a 1945 Swedish drama film directed by Alf Sjöberg and starring Gunn Wållgren,  Holger Löwenadler and Maj-Britt Nilsson. It was shot at the Råsunda Studios in Stockholm and on location around Lysekil. The film's sets were designed by the art directors Nils Svenwall and Arne Åkermark.

Cast
 Gunn Wållgren as Ellen Andersson
 Holger Löwenadler as Hjalmar Andersson
 Sture Lagerwall as Bernt
 Maj-Britt Nilsson as Eva
 Lars Nordrum as Ole
 Hjördis Petterson as Miss Wetterdahl
 Åke Claesson as Doctor Löfberg
 Carl Deurell as the Salvation Army officer 
 Josua Bengtson as the train passenger
 Astrid Bodin as the woman cashier
 Nils Dahlgren as the bank manager
 Åke Engfeldt as the man in the bar
 David Erikson as a hotel guest
 Mona Geijer-Falkner as the cook
 Gösta Gustafson as the bank accountant 
 Agda Helin as a hotel guest 
 Jullan Kindahl as the nurse 
 Segol Mann as the policeman 
 Viveca Serlachius as the maid 
 Georg Årlin as a hotel guest

References

Bibliography 
 Qvist, Per Olov & von Bagh, Peter. Guide to the Cinema of Sweden and Finland. Greenwood Publishing Group, 2000.

External links
 

1945 films
1940s Swedish-language films
1945 drama films
Swedish black-and-white films
Films directed by Alf Sjöberg
Swedish drama films
1940s Swedish films